The DB-LK (Dahl'niy Bombardirovshchik-LK  – long-range bomber–flying wing) was a bomber aircraft designed and built in the USSR in 1939.

Development
Viktor Nikolayevich Belyayev had an illustrious early career with TsAGI, AVIAVnito, Aeroflot, OMOS, AGOS, KOSOS and the Tupolev OKB. He also designed and built several gliders from 1920, including flying wing designs, and in 1934 he designed a transport aircraft with twin tail-booms each accommodating ten passengers.

Belyaev developed the twin boom idea into the twin-fuselage DB-LK, which had two short fuselages either side of a very long chord wing centre section, with  the outer wing sections swept forward 5 deg 42 min, tapering at 7:1 out to raked back tips. A large fin and rudder on a short central boom, carried a small tailplane with very large elevators.

The airframe was of light alloy stressed skin construction with five spar wings covered with sheet aluminium alloy. Each fuselage pod carried a single M-88 engine in a long chord cowling, driving a three-bladed VISh-23D propeller, as well as a pilot/navigator cockpit and radio operator/gunner station in each of the extensively glazed tail-cones. The outer wings had slats, ailerons and 45deg Zap flaps, the raked tips also had small ailerons. The retractable undercarriage consisted of single main legs in the fuselage pods aft of the engines and a tail-wheel in the base of the fin.

Before flight trials began, the test pilot, M.A. Nyukhtikov, carried out many fast taxis to assess the handling of the unconventional DB-LK, one of which ended in an undercarriage collapse. Flight trials eventually got under way early in 1940 revealing an excellent performance, but with a high sensitivity to centre of gravity changes. Production was not authorised.

Specifications (DB-LK)

See also

References

Sources
 Gunston, Bill. The Osprey Encyclopaedia of Russian Aircraft 1875–1995 London, Osprey. 1995.

External links

 DB-LK on the Sky Corner
DB-LK on Dieselpunks 

1940s Soviet bomber aircraft
DB-LK
Twin-fuselage aircraft
Abandoned military aircraft projects of the Soviet Union
Mid-wing aircraft
Aircraft first flown in 1940
Twin piston-engined tractor aircraft